Yulia Blindyuk (born 11 December 1984) is a road cyclist from Russia. She represented her nation at the 2006 and 2008 UCI Road World Championships.

References

External links
 profile at Procyclingstats.com

1984 births
Russian female cyclists
Living people
Place of birth missing (living people)